Aleksejs Semjonovs (born 2 April 1973) is a retired Latvian international football midfielder, who also holds the Russian nationality. He obtained a total number of nine caps for the Latvia national football team, scoring two goals. His last club was Dinaburg FC. He also played in Estonia and Russia during his career.

References
 
 

1973 births
Living people
Latvian footballers
Latvia international footballers
Association football midfielders
Latvian expatriate footballers
Skonto FC players
Expatriate footballers in Russia
Latvian expatriate sportspeople in Russia
Expatriate footballers in Estonia